Martha Cecilia Ruíz (b. 25 November 1972) is a Nicaraguan poet, writer, journalist, and Social activist. She directs the El País Azul radio talk show, sits on the board of directors of Nicaraguan Association of Writers (ANIDE) as a member (2015–2018), is a consultant in Communication and Human Rights, and has founded both Three Times Three (Three Women, Three Poets, Three Journalists) and the Forum of Cultural Journalists of Nicaragua (FPCN). Ruiz's writings have been included in numerous anthologies and she has published a single narrative book as of November 2017.

Biography
Ruiz was born in Managua, and holds degrees in Journalism, Communication, Child Rights, Gender and Human Development, all from the Central American University of Managua.

In the early 2000s, Ruiz founded the group Three Times Three: Three Women, Three Poets, Three Journalists with Esther Picado and Vilma Duarte. She also founded the Forum of Cultural Journalists of Nicaragua and the Network of Communicators to broach the topic of HIV and AIDS in Nicaragua.

Radio
Ruiz hosts the El País Azul talk show broadcast on Radio La Primerísima every Sunday from 7 to 8 am CST.

Bibliography

Book
In 2016, Ruiz published her first narrative book Familia de Cuchillos.

Anthologies
The writings of Martha Cecilia Ruíz have been included in many anthologies, all listed below.

Antología Mujeres Poetas en el País de las Nubes. Mizteca Culture Studies Center. Mexico, 2008
De Azul a Rojo. Voces de poetas nicaragüenses del Siglo XXI. Managua, 2011.
Nosotras también contamos. Muestra de Narrativa. ANIDE. Managua, 2013
Esta palabra es nuestra. ANIDE. Managua, 2014
Hermanas de tinta. Muestra de poesía multiétnica de mujeres nicaragüenses. ANIDE. Managua, 2014
Antología Cuentos nicaragüense de ayer y hoy. Lacayo, Chamorro César y Valle-Castillo. USA, 2014
99 Palabras de Mujer. Microrrelatos y otras especies. Marianela Corriols editora. Managua, 2016

Citations

External links
 Personal website

1972 births
Living people
Nicaraguan women poets
People from Managua
Central American University (Managua) alumni